The Doubles competition at the 2021 FIL World Luge Championships was held on 30 January 2021.

Results
The first run was held at 09:33 and the second run at 10:52.

References

Doubles